This article presents a list of the historical events and publications of Australian literature during 1966.

Major publications

Books 

 James Aldridge
 My Brother Tom
 The Statesman's Games
 Jon Cleary
 The High Commissioner
 The Pulse of Danger
 Peter Cowan – Seed
 Elizabeth Harrower – The Watch Tower
 Shirley Hazzard – The Evening of the Holiday
 Morris Lurie – Rappaport
 Peter Mathers – Trap
 Christina Stead – Dark Places of the Heart
 Arthur Upfield – The Lake Frome Monster
 Judah Waten – Season of Youth
 Patrick White – The Solid Mandala

Short stories 

 James Hackston – Father Clears Out
 Elizabeth Harrower – "The Beautiful Climate"
 D'Arcy Niland – Pairs and Loners
 Patrick White – "The Full Belly"
 Judith Wright – The Nature of Love

Children's and Young Adult fiction 

 Mavis Thorpe Clark – The Min-Min
 Max Fatchen – The River Kings
 Elyne Mitchell – Silver Brumby Kingdom
 Ruth Park
 The Muddle-Headed Wombat at School
 The Muddle-Headed Wombat in the Snow
 Joan Phipson – The Crew of the Merlin
 Judith Wright – The River and the Road

Poetry 

 Vincent Buckley – Arcady and Other Places : Poems
 Bruce Dawe – "The Not-So-Good Earth"
 William Hart-Smith – The Talking Clothes: Poems
 Dorothy Hewett – "Legend of the Green Country"
 A. D. Hope – Collected Poems 1930 - 1965
 Les Murray – "Evening Alone at Bunyah"
 Oodgeroo Noonuccal – "No More Boomerang"
 Judith Wright – The Other Half : Poems

Biography 

 Hal Porter – The Paper Chase
 Clement Semmler – Kenneth Slessor

Non-Fiction 

 Geoffrey Blainey – The Tyranny of Distance

Awards and honours

Literary

Children and Young Adult

Poetry

Births 

A list, ordered by date of birth (and, if the date is either unspecified or repeated, ordered alphabetically by surname) of births in 1966 of Australian literary figures, authors of written works or literature-related individuals follows, including year of death.

 3 June – Kate Forsyth, novelist

Unknown date

 Delia Falconer, novelist
 Anna Funder, novelist
 Malcolm Knox, novelist
 Andrew McGahan, novelist (died 2019)

Deaths 

A list, ordered by date of death (and, if the date is either unspecified or repeated, ordered alphabetically by surname) of deaths in 1966 of Australian literary figures, authors of written works or literature-related individuals follows, including year of birth.

 16 April – Eric Lambert, novelist (born 1918)
 28 May – Edward Harrington, bush balladist and short story writer (born 1896)
 18 August – Myra Morris, author and poet (born 1893)

See also 
 1966 in Australia
 1966 in literature
 1966 in poetry
 List of years in Australian literature
 List of years in literature

References

 
Australian literature by year
20th-century Australian literature
1966 in literature